John L. Tienson (1940-2018) was an American philosopher and professor emeritus of philosophy at the University of Memphis. He served as Co-Editor of the Southern Journal of Philosophy.

References

American philosophers
Philosophy academics
2018 deaths
1940 births
University of California, Berkeley alumni
University of Illinois alumni
Philosophers of mind
Philosophers of language